James Clark Fulton McCrae (also spelt McRae, McRea, McCray and McCabe; 2 September 1894 – 3 September 1974) was a Scottish football player and manager. His brother was Scottish international player David McCrae.

Playing career
Born in Bridge of Weir, McCrae signed professional forms with Clyde in 1912, but his playing career was interrupted by the First World War. During the War, McCrae joined the Grenadier Guards, playing for their football team, as well as guesting for Clyde, Rangers, and West Ham United. McCrae joined West Ham United permanently in June 1919, playing in their first ever League game. McCrae also played for Bury, Wigan Borough, New Brighton, Manchester United and Watford, and he made a total of 187 appearances in the Football League. McCrae later played in Scotland for Third Lanark and his first club, Clyde, before retiring in 1928.

Coaching career
McCrae coached Egypt at the 1934 FIFA World Cup, and also managed İstanbulspor in Turkey and Fram of Iceland.

Honours 
Fran
Icelandic League: 1946, 1947

References

External links
Profile at Ye Olde Tree & Crown

1894 births
1974 deaths
Scottish footballers
Scottish football managers
Scottish expatriate football managers
1934 FIFA World Cup managers
Clyde F.C. players
Rangers F.C. wartime guest players
Scottish expatriate sportspeople in Egypt
Scottish expatriate sportspeople in Iceland
Scottish expatriate sportspeople in Turkey
West Ham United F.C. players
Bury F.C. players
Wigan Borough F.C. players
New Brighton A.F.C. players
Manchester United F.C. players
Watford F.C. players
Third Lanark A.C. players
Expatriate football managers in Turkey
Expatriate football managers in Egypt
Egypt national football team managers
Knattspyrnufélagið Fram managers
Expatriate football managers in Iceland
Association football wing halves
Footballers from Paisley, Renfrewshire
St Mirren F.C. wartime guest players
West Ham United F.C. wartime guest players
Military personnel from Renfrewshire
British Army personnel of World War I
Grenadier Guards soldiers